Iranian migration to Thailand began as early as the 17th century. Thai citizens of Iranian background or descent may be called in Thai: Khaek Ma-ngon, Khaek Mahon or Khaek Chaosen ("Shia Muslim"). There is a community of Thai people of Iranian descent who still practice Shia Islam in many districts throughout Bangkok, such as Yan Nawa, Bueng Kum, Saphan Sung, and Min Buri, as well as parts of Chachoengsao Province.

History
During the Ayutthaya Kingdom period, the Iranian community in Thailand consisted primarily of merchants. They are recorded in some memoirs of their fellow merchants, the Dutch East India Company, as well as in the Safine-ye Solaymani ("Ship of Solayman"), an account of a Persian embassy to King Narai. Some descendants of Iranians from the Ayutthaya period converted to Buddhism, and continued to retain influence in Thai public life to the present day; one prominent example is the Bunnag family, whose ancestor "Shaykh Ahmad" is said to have come from Qom and arrived at Ayutthaya in 1602. Shaykh Ahmad crushed and defeated Japanese merchants who attempted a coup against the Thai king in 1611.

Influence and legacy 
The presence of Iranians in Thailand came to be felt within the commerce, art, architecture, and culture of Thailand. Pieces of Thai architecture, art, and literature sometimes incorporated Persian-style icons, motifs, and more.

Modern tourism
In recent years, Thailand has become a popular destination for Iranian medical tourists. However, due to numerous incidents of methamphetamine smuggling, Iranians coming to Thailand fall under heavy suspicion from police.

Cultural Center
An Iranian Cultural Center exists in Bangkok that convenes Persian language classes and facilitates translations of Iranian works into the Thai language.

See also 
 Iran–Thailand relations

References

Bibliography

Further reading

Ethnic groups in Thailand
Thailand